Jan Ohlsson (full name Jan Torsten Olsson, born 3 June 1962 in Uppsala) is a Swedish former child actor. He is well known for his role as Emil in Emil i Lönneberga, Nya hyss av Emil i Lönneberga and Emil och griseknoen. Now he works as a computer engineer.

References

Bibliography
 Holmstrom, John. The Moving Picture Boy: An International Encyclopaedia from 1895 to 1995. Norwich, Michael Russell, 1996, p. 340.

External links

tisdag  23 februari 2021

People from Uppsala
Swedish male child actors
Living people
1962 births